Pur Chaman (also transliterated as Purchaman or Porchaman) is a mountainous district in Farah province, Afghanistan. Its population is approximately 95% Tajik with a Pashtun minority. The main village, also called Purchaman  is situated at 1431 m altitude.

Religious role
Pur Chaman was the center of operations for the Naqshbandi Sufi leader (pir) of the Aimaq ethnic group until the late 1970s, when the last pir, Baha'uddin Jan, was killed under the Taraki government.

Sources
 UNHCR District Profile, compiled September–October 2004, accessed 2006-06-06 (PDF).

External links
 Map of Farah Province settlements (Pur Chaman District) IOM Displacement Tracking Matrix, March 2018
 http://www.afghanan.se/afghanan_2011/Afghanistan%20Mapper/Farah%20Map/pur_chaman.pdf Map of Settlements] AIMS, May 2002 
Map of Pur Chaman(PDF)

References

Districts of Farah Province